Faulkner is a name variant of the English surname Falconer. It is of medieval origin taken from Old French Faulconnier, "falcon trainer". It can also be used as a first name or as a middle name.

People with the surname

A–J
 Adam Faulkner (swimmer) (born 1981), British swimmer
 Alex Faulkner (born 1936), Canadian ice hockey player
 Alexander Faulkner Shand (1858–1936), English writer and barrister
 Andrew Faulkner (born 1992), American baseball player
 Arthur Faulkner (1921–1985), New Zealand politician
 Aubrey Faulkner (1881–1930), South African cricketer
 Bayard H. Faulkner (1894–1983), American politician
 Bobo Faulkner (1941–2014), English model, television personality, was married to Trader Faulkner
 Brian Faulkner, Baron Faulkner of Downpatrick (1921–1977), Northern Irish politician
 Cameron Faulkner (born 1984), Australian rules footballer 
 Charles Faulkner (disambiguation), several people
 Charmian Faulkner, Australian missing person
 Chris Faulkner (born 1960), American football player 
 Colleen Faulkner, American author
 Damien Faulkner (born 1977), Irish race car driver
 Daniel Faulkner (1955–1981), American police officer
 David Faulkner (disambiguation), several people
 Dennis Faulkner (1926–2016), Northern Irish military officer
 Elizabeth Faulkner, common misspelling of Elizabeth Falkner (born 1966), American chef
 Eric Faulkner (born 1953), guitarist in the 1970s band the Bay City Rollers
 Eric Faulkner, pseudonym of May Brahe (1884–1956), Australian music composer 
 Gary Faulkner Jr. (born 1990), American ten-pin bowler
 George Faulkner ( 1703–1775), Irish publisher
 George Faulkner (disambiguation), any of several people of the same name
 Graham Faulkner (born 1947), British actor
 Harris Faulkner (born 1965), American newscaster
 Henry Faulkner (1924–1981), American artist
 Hugh Faulkner (born 1933), Canadian politician
 Jack Faulkner (1926–2008), American football coach and administrator
 James Faulkner (disambiguation), any of several people of the same name
 Jeff Faulkner (born 1964), American football player
 Joan Faulkner-Blake (1921–1990), New Zealand broadcaster
 Joanne Faulkner (born 1972), Australian writer and philosopher
 John Faulkner (born 1954), Australian politician
 John Faulkner (racing driver) (born 1952), New Zealand-Australian racing driver
 John Alfred Faulkner (1857–1931), American church historian
 Ricky Michael Faulkner (1989-present), England Sheffield

K–Z
 Kenneth William Faulkner (born 1947), American politician
 Larry Faulkner (born 1944), American academic and businessman
 Lisa Faulkner (born 1973), British actress
 Louise Faulkner, Australian missing person
 Mary Faulkner, pseudonym of Kathleen Lindsay (1903–1973), English author
 Max Faulkner (1916–2005), British golfer
 Mike Faulkner, American guitarist
 Neil Faulkner (disambiguation), several people
 Newton Faulkner (born 1985), British musician
 Pádraig Faulkner (born 1918), Irish politician
 Peter Faulkner (born 1960), Australian cricketer
 Raymond O. Faulkner (1894–1982), British Egyptologist and philologist
 Richie Faulkner (born 1980), English guitarist
 Richard Faulkner, Baron Faulkner of Worcester (born 1946), British politician
 Roy Faulkner (born 1897), Canadian association football player
 Sally Faulkner (born 1944), British film and television actress
 Sandford C. Faulkner (1803–1874), American composer and fiddler
 Shannon Faulkner (born 1975), American military cadet and educator
 Shawn Faulkner (born 1962), American football player
 Steve Faulkner (born 1954), British footballer
 Tom Faulkner ( 1719–1785), English cricketer, wrestler and boxer
 Ronald Trader Faulkner (1927–2021), Australian actor, was married to Bobo Faulkner
 Walt Faulkner (1918–1956), American racing driver
 William Faulkner (1897–1962), American novelist

People with the middle name
 Bruce Faulkner Caputo (born 1943), American politician
 Fred Faulkner Lester (1926–1945), United States Navy sailor, Medal of Honor recipient
 George Faulkner Wetherbee (1851–1920), American painter

Fictional characters with the surname
 Adam Faulkner (Saw), character from the Saw film series
 Bjorn Faulkner, protagonist of the 1934 play Night of January 16th by Ayn Rand
 Kitty Faulkner, real-life name of the DC Comics character Rampage
 Lesley Williams Faulkner, character of the ABC soap opera General Hospital
 Ted Faulkner, character of the Australian television program Blue Heelers
Robert Faulkner (Assassin's Creed), a sailor in Assassin's Creed III

See also
 Faulkner (disambiguation)
 Falconer (surname)
Faulconer (surname)
 Falkner (disambiguation)
 Faulknor (disambiguation)
 Fawkner (disambiguation)

English-language surnames
Occupational surnames
English-language occupational surnames